Ars vetus may refer to

 The ars antiqua in medieval European music
 The logica vetus in medieval European logic